Karjalan veljeskunta (Karelian Brotherhood) was an organization founded in 1907 as a Russian Orthodox society, whose goal was to russify Karelias orthodox population. It had close ties to Russian nationalists in the State Duma.

The chief of the organization was bishop Kiprian (Kyprianos). Karjalan veljeskunta was dissolved when Finland obtained its independence in 1917.

References

Organizations established in 1907
1907 establishments in the Russian Empire
Orthodox Church of Finland
Eastern Orthodoxy in Finland